A Basket Toss is a stunt performed in cheerleading using 3 or more bases to toss a flyer into the air.  Two of the bases interlock their hands.  While in the air, the flyer does some type of jump, ranging from toe-touches to herkies before returning to the cradle.

Bases 

The person or persons who stays in contact with the floor while lifting a flyer into a stunt.

Flyer 

The person that is held or tossed into the air by the bases in a stunt.

Toe-Touch 

A jump where the legs are straddled, and extended, toes pointed, and arms in the T-motion.  Documented as the most common cheerleader jump.

Herkies 

It is named for Lawrence Herkimer, the founder of the National Cheerleaders Association. A jump where one leg is out to the side in a toe touch position and the other leg is bent toward the ground.  Herkies vary from a left to a right herkie.  In a left herkie, the left leg is straight with the right leg bent toward the ground, and vice versa for a right herkie. Herkies are also called hurdlers because the way a person jumps a hurdle in track has the same leg position.

References 

Cheerleading